Robert David Redmile (born 11 February 1961) is the second Bishop of Richmond of the Christian Episcopal Church of Canada, having succeeded the Primate, and first Bishop of Richmond, Donald Davies, as the second bishop of the diocese, in 2004.

Early life and education

Redmile was born on 11 February 1961, in Vancouver, British Columbia. He is the eldest son of David Henry Wilfred Redmile, a former pilot and aeronautical engineer, and a retired director of three major Canadian airlines; and Arlene Louise Redmile (née Schell), a retired registered nurse, and a well-known Canadian artist in watercolors and acrylics. He has one brother, Donald Scott Redmile, who lives in Edmonton, Alberta.

Redmile obtained a diploma from Langara College and Bachelor of Arts and Bachelor of Education degrees from the University of British Columbia. During this time he also articled in a firm of chartered accountants, which proved to be a good preparation for overseeing the temporalities of the Church. Having first read history, specializing in Classics, Mediaeval History, and British Imperial History, and then reading for a degree in Secondary Education, Bishop Redmile taught History, English, Modern Languages, Religion, and Law, for several years in both public and private schools. He began to study for the sacred Ministry, and read Patristics, Dogmatics, and Moral Theology, Biblical Languages, and Canon Law, and furthered his studies in Developmental and Pastoral Psychology, in preparation for ordination. It was arranged, due to the extraordinary circumstances of the Church at the time, for him to study under such well-known orthodox Anglican theologians as J. I. Packer of Regent College, University of British Columbia, and Bishop A. Donald Davies, Bishop Jon Mark Lindenauer, and Father John D. Keliher, of the Missionary Diocese of the Americas of the Episcopal Church. He was granted a Licentiate in Sacred Theology in 1993.

Ministry

Redmile was made Deacon on 20 May 1993, by the Right Reverend Patrick Murphy of the Missionary Diocese of the Americas, and was appointed by Bishop A. Donald Davies as the Minister-in-Charge of the newly founded Parish of Saint Saviour, Richmond, British Columbia. He was ordained Priest on 17 December 1993, and was appointed Rector of the Parish. He later founded the Parish of Saint George the Martyr, White Rock, British Columbia, and was appointed its first Rector. In 2000, Father Redmile was appointed Archdeacon of Richmond.

Redmile was elected Bishop by an Electoral Synod, and on 25 July 2002 this was confirmed by the Bishops. He was appointed Bishop Coadjutor of the Diocese of Richmond by Archbishop Davies. On 8 September 2002, he was consecrated Bishop by the Primate, Archbishop A. Donald Davies, and by Bishop Jon Mark Lindenauer and Bishop Theodore C. Casimes. This particular consecration was unique inasmuch as it had brought together all the principal lines of the Apostolic Succession of the Anglican Communion, as well as the lines of succession of the Greek Orthodox Church, the Churches of the Utrecht Union, the Polish National Catholic Church, and the Roman Catholic Church; and, from this coming together of various valid lines of Catholic Succession, an orthodox, valid, and regular succession has since been passed on to the Bishops of the Christian Episcopal Churches of North America, all of whom have been consecrated by Bishop Redmile as their chief consecrator, employing an orthodox Anglican Catholic rite. On 20 May 2004, Redmile was enthroned by the Primate of Canada, Archbishop A. Donald Davies, as his successor in the See of Richmond.

Bishop of Richmond
The Diocese of Richmond extends from Greater Vancouver to the Cayman Islands and to the Channel Islands and France, and counts many people in various communities across Canada as communicants and supporters. Redmile is assisted in the oversight of the Diocese by two Suffragan Bishops, both resident overseas. Since 2016, the Christian Episcopal Church of Canada has been in full communion with the Anglican Catholic Church of Canada, and is working to achieve intercommunion with other orthodox Anglican bodies with ministries operating in Canada.

Personal life

Redmile is a member of the Royal Heraldry Society of Canada, and is armigerous, his armorial achievement having been granted to him on behalf of Queen Elizabeth II by the Governor General of Canada, David Johnston, on 15 November 2011.

References

1961 births
Living people
21st-century Anglican bishops in Canada
Anglican bishops of British Columbia
People from Vancouver
Langara College people